Castle Pines is a former census-designated place (CDP) in Douglas County, Colorado, United States. The population was 3,614 at the 2010 census.

On November 6, 2007, the northern portion of the Castle Pines CDP was incorporated as the City of Castle Pines North and the southern portion remained as Castle Pines.

On November 2, 2010, the City of Castle Pines North rename themselves to the City of Castle Pines and the Castle Pines CDP was renamed to Castle Pines Village as a result.

Geography

Demographics

As of the census of 2000, there were 5,958 people, 2,078 households, and 1,886 families residing in the CDP. The racial makeup of the CDP was 95.85% White, 0.89% African American, 0.34% Native American, 1.29% Asian, 0.57% from other races, and 1.06% from two or more races. Hispanic or Latino of any race were 3.16% of the population.

There were 2,078 households, out of which 44.0% had children under the age of 18 living with them, 86.5% were married couples living together, 3.0% had a female householder with no husband present, and 9.2% were non-families. 6.8% of all households were made up of individuals, and 1.0% had someone living alone who was 65 years of age or older.  The average household size was 2.87 and the average family size was 3.01.

In the CDP, the population was spread out, with 29.5% under the age of 18, 2.9% from 18 to 24, 29.8% from 25 to 44, 33.5% from 45 to 64, and 4.3% who were 65 years of age or older.  The median age was 40 years. For every 100 females there were 101.3 males.  For every 100 females age 18 and over, there were 99.4 males.

The median income for a household in the CDP was $138,035, and the median income for a family was $140,816. Males had a median income of $93,254 versus $57,054 for females. The per capita income for the CDP was $70,456.  About 0.3% of families and 0.3% of the population were below the poverty line, including none of those under the age of eighteen or sixty-five or over.

See also

Outline of Colorado
Index of Colorado-related articles
State of Colorado
Colorado cities and towns
Colorado census designated places
Colorado counties
Douglas County, Colorado
Colorado metropolitan areas
Front Range Urban Corridor
North Central Colorado Urban Area
Denver-Aurora-Boulder, CO Combined Statistical Area
Denver-Aurora-Broomfield, CO Metropolitan Statistical Area

References

Former census-designated places in Colorado
Denver metropolitan area